Quintieri is an Italian locational surname, which originally meant a person from one of the places called Quinto in Italy. The word quinto is derived from the Latin quintus, meaning "fifth". The name may refer to:

Adolfo Quintieri (1887–1970), Italian politician
Damiano Quintieri (born 1990), Italian football player
Quinto Quintieri (1894–1968), Italian engineer, banker and politician
Raffaele Simone Quintieri (born 1982), Italian football player

See also
Quinteros

References

Italian-language surnames